Ajis bin Sitin (born 8 April 1963) is a Malaysian civil servant who has served as the Director-General of Department of Orang Asli Development from 2017 to 2019. He was appointed as a Senator on 25 August 2021 to represent Pahang.

Honours 
 :
  Knight Companion of the Order of the Crown of Pahang (DIMP) – Dato' (2018)

References 

1963 births
Living people
People from Pahang
Orang Asli
Members of the Dewan Negara
Malaysian civil servants
Malaysian politicians